Pechincha  is a neighborhood in the West Zone of Rio de Janeiro, Brazil.

References 

Neighbourhoods in Rio de Janeiro (city)